The 2019 Africa Women's Sevens was a women's rugby sevens tournament held in Monastir, Tunisia on 12–13 October 2019.

The tournament acted as qualification for the 2020 Hong Kong Women's Sevens, which in turns serves as a qualification tournament for the World Rugby Women's Sevens Series.

The tournament also acted as qualification for the 2020 Summer Olympics.

South Africa won the tournament and qualified for the Hong Kong Sevens along with Kenya. South Africa declined Olympics qualification so Kenya earned the automatic qualifying spot.

Teams

Pool stage

The top two teams in each pool as well as the two best 3rd ranked teams qualify for the cup quarterfinals.

Pool A

Pool B

Pool C

Knockout stage

Challenge Trophy

5th place

Cup

Final standings

References

Rugby sevens at the 2020 Summer Olympics – Women's qualification
2019
2019 rugby sevens competitions
2019 in African rugby union
rugby union
2019 in women's rugby union
Africa Women's Sevens